Melvin Patrick Ely (pronounced ; born 1952 in Richmond, Virginia) is an history professor and author in Virginia. He has written books about Amos 'n' Andy and Israel Hill.

Life
He grew up in Richmond and graduated from Princeton University, and from the University of Texas at Austin with a master's degree in linguistics, and from Princeton University with a master's degree in history in 1982 and with a doctoral degree in 1985. He taught at Yale University, and at the Hebrew University of Jerusalem. He is currently the William R. Kenan, Jr. Professor of Humanities at the College of William and Mary.

Awards
 2005 Bancroft Prize
 1998–1999 Fulbright Professor of American Studies

Works

 Amos 'n' Andy: lineage, life, and legacy, Princeton University, 1985

References

External links

"Interview with Bancroft Winner Melvin Patrick Ely", History News Network, 5-23-05
"Melvin Patrick Ely, 'Israel on the Appomattox'", Tavis Smiley Show, November 24, 2004

Writers from Richmond, Virginia
21st-century American historians
American male non-fiction writers
Living people
Princeton University alumni
University of Texas at Austin College of Liberal Arts alumni
Yale University faculty
Academic staff of the Hebrew University of Jerusalem
College of William & Mary faculty
1952 births
Bancroft Prize winners
Historians from Virginia
21st-century American male writers